White Squall may refer to:

 White squall, a meteorological phenomenon
 White Squall (film), a 1996 American drama by Ridley Scott
 "White Squall" (song), a 1984 song by Stan Rogers